The Diplocaulidae ("double cauls") is an extinct family of lepospondyl amphibians that arose during the Late Carboniferous and died out in the Late Permian.  They are distinguished from other amphibians, extinct and extant, by the presence of strange, horn-like protrusions jutting out from the rear of their skulls; in some genera said protrusions gave their heads an almost boomerang-like outline.

Phylogeny
Below is a cladogram modified from Germain (2010):

References

Diplocaulids
Pennsylvanian first appearances
Lopingian extinctions

es:Keraterpetontidae